Bruce North was a federal electoral district  in Ontario, Canada, that was represented in the House of Commons of Canada from 1867 to 1935. It was created by the British North America Act of 1867 which divided the county of Bruce into two ridings: Bruce North and Bruce South.

Geography

The North Riding of Bruce consisted initially of the Townships of Bury, Lindsay, Eastnor, Albemarle, Amabel, Arran, Bruce, Elderslie, and Saugeen, and the Village of Southampton.

In 1882, the riding was redefined to exclude the Townships of Bury, Bruce, and Saugeen, and include the township of St. Edmunds and the villages of Wiarton, Chesley, Tara, Paisley and Port Elgin. In 1892, it was redefined to include the Saugeen and Cape Croker Indian reserves.

In 1903, it was redefined as consisting of the townships of Albemarle, Amabel, Arran, Bruce, Eastnor, Kincardine, Lindsay, Saugeen and St. Edmunds, the towns of Kincardine and Wiarton, and the villages of Port Elgin, Southampton, Tara and Tiverton.

In 1924, it was redefined as consisting of the part of the county of Bruce lying north of and including the townships of Kincardine, Bruce, Saugeen and Arran.

The electoral district was abolished in 1933 when it was merged into Bruce riding.

Election results

|}

|}

|}

|}

|}

|}

 

|}

On Mr. McNeill's election being declared void, 2 December 1901:

|}

|}

On Mr. Bland's death, 19 August 1906:

|}

|}

|}

|}

|}

|}

|}

On acceptance by James Malcolm of an office of emolument under the Crown, 22 October 1926:

|}

|}

See also 

 List of Canadian federal electoral districts
 Past Canadian electoral districts

References

External links 
Riding history from the Library of Parliament

Former federal electoral districts of Ontario